"Getting Better" is the second single from the Shed Seven album A Maximum High. The song spent a total of 3 weeks in the UK Singles Chart, peaking at number 14 on 27 January 1996, while doing better in Scotland at number 10.

The song also appears on the band's compilation albums Going For Gold and The Singles Collection, along with the live albums Where Have You Been Tonight? and Live At The BBC.

The song was used as the theme tune for the ITV2 reality show CelebAir which was featured celebrities undertaking the roles of Check-In Attendants and Airline Cabin-Crew. The show was broadcast between 2 September 2008 and 23 October 2008 and was won by Lisa Maffia.

The BBC used the song towards the end of the group games in the FIFA World Cup 2010, to add hope to England World Cup campaign. England would later crash out of the group stage with only one point to their name.

Track listing

7" vinyl, Cassette
Getting Better
Only Dreaming

CD
Getting Better
Only Dreaming
Song Seven

References

1996 singles
Shed Seven songs
Song recordings produced by Chris Sheldon
1996 songs
Polydor Records singles